Diyan Petkov Dimov (born 4 August 1967) is a former Bulgarian footballer and currently manager of Neftochimic Burgas.

Career
He played for Naftex Burgas, Chernomorets Burgas, Lokomotiv Plovdiv, Lokomotiv Sofia, Nesebar/Slanchev Bryag and C.F. Os Belenenses. In 'A' group has 268 matches and 64 goals. Secondly in 1995 and third place in the 1996 with Lokomotiv Sofia and a finalist for the Bulgarian Cup in 1989 on a Chernomorets Burgas. In UEFA has 14 matches and 2 goals (4 matches with 1 goal for Lokomotiv Sofia and 2 matches with 1 goal for Chernomorets Burgas in SSC, 4 matches for Lokomotiv Sofia and 2 matches Naftex Burgas for the tournament for the Cup of the UEFA).

International career
He played for the Bulgaria national football team only 1 game.

Coaching career
Petkov is former coach of Pomorie, Chernomorets Burgas and Naftex Burgas. On 1 July 2009 he was officially presented senior as coach of Sliven and on 3 November 2009 the Coach has quit the club, a replacement has not been named yet.

On 5 July 2017, Petkov was appointed as assistant manager of Neftochimic.

References

External links
Player Profile at foradejogo.net

1967 births
Living people
Sportspeople from Burgas
Bulgarian footballers
Bulgaria international footballers
Bulgarian football managers
Neftochimic Burgas players
FC Chernomorets Burgas players
PFC Lokomotiv Plovdiv players
FC Lokomotiv 1929 Sofia players
C.F. Os Belenenses players
PFC Nesebar players
First Professional Football League (Bulgaria) players
Second Professional Football League (Bulgaria) players
Primeira Liga players
Bulgarian expatriate footballers
Bulgarian expatriate sportspeople in Portugal
Expatriate footballers in Portugal
PSFC Chernomorets Burgas managers
FC Lokomotiv 1929 Sofia managers
Association football midfielders